Nathalie Pallet (born 25 May 1964) is a French fencer. She competed in the women's team foil event at the 1988 Summer Olympics.

References

External links
 

1964 births
Living people
French female foil fencers
Olympic fencers of France
Fencers at the 1988 Summer Olympics
People from Angoulême
Sportspeople from Charente